Trulli may refer to:

 The plural of trullo, a traditional Apulian stone dwelling with a conical roof
 Enzo Trulli, Italian racing driver, son of Jarno Trulli
 Giovanni Trulli (1599–1661), Italian surgeon
 Jarno Trulli, Formula One driver 
 The Trulli Formula E Team team founded by Jarno Trulli
 A type of Kart chassis named after Jarno Trulli
 Trulli Tales, a 2017 French-Italian animated series.